Nevermore is a 2007 film written and directed by independent director Thomas Zambeck.

Plot
Judd Nelson plays a wealthy but unstable hermit, Jonathan Usher, who is convinced he will soon become insane much as his father did; his father actually did go insane and murdered Jonathan's mother.

He hires a private investigator (Vincent Spano) to look into his wife's possible motives for helping drive him insane. The wife, Jennifer O'Dell, is a sort of trophy wife; Jonathan is certain that she is out to both drive him insane and rob him of his fortune.

References

External links
 
 
 

2007 films
2007 drama films
American independent films
American drama films
2007 independent films
2000s English-language films
2000s American films
English-language drama films